William Lloyd Davis (born August 22, 1954) is a Canadian former professional ice hockey defenceman who played in the World Hockey Association (WHA). Davis played parts of two WHA seasons with the Winnipeg Jets. He was drafted in the fourteenth round of the 1974 NHL amateur draft by the Pittsburgh Penguins.

Career statistics

References

External links

1954 births
Canadian ice hockey defencemen
Colgate Raiders men's ice hockey players
Ice hockey people from Ontario
Living people
Philadelphia Firebirds (AHL) players
Pittsburgh Penguins draft picks
Sportspeople from Kawartha Lakes
Tulsa Oilers (1964–1984) players
Winnipeg Jets (WHA) players
Canadian expatriate ice hockey players in the United States